The Kawasaki Ki-88 was a proposed Japanese World War II fighter aircraft intended for use by the Imperial Japanese Army Air Force. Its anticipated performance was disappointing, and only a mock-up was completed.

Design and development

Faced with delays in development of the Kawasaki Ki-64 fighter, the Imperial Japanese Army was open in 1942 to alternative fighter designs that might reach combat units more quickly. Kawasaki proposed the Ki-88, a design inspired by the Bell P-39 Airacobra fighter then in service with the United States Army Air Forces.

Kawasaki began design work on the Ki-88 in August 1942. The Ki-88 was to have a 1,117-kW (1,500-hp) Kawasaki Ha-140 engine behind its cockpit, driving a tractor propeller through an extension shaft. It was to mount a 37-mm cannon in its propeller shaft and two 20-mm cannon in its lower nose.

When design work had progressed far enough to allow it, Kawasaki built a full-scale mock-up of the Ki-88, which bore a strong resemblance to the P-39. After inspection of the mockup, the Japanese calculated a maximum speed for the aircraft of 600 km/hr (373 mph) at an altitude of 6,000 m (19,685 feet). This was only slightly faster than the Kawasaki Ki-61 Hien fighter, which already was in production. As a result, Kawasaki discontinued design work on the Ki-88 less than a year after beginning it.

Specifications

See also

References

Notes

Bibliography

External links

 Kawasaki Ki-88 on valka.cz

Ki-088, Kawasaki
Ki-088
Ki-088, Kawasaki
Ki-088, Kawasaki